Keosauqua is a city in Van Buren County, Iowa, United States. The population was 936 at the time of the 2020 census. It is the county seat of Van Buren County.

History

Keosauqua was laid out in 1839. The word Keosauqua derives from the Meskwaki and Sauk name for the Des Moines River, "Ke-o-saw-qua", which literally translates as "Bend in the River".

The Hotel Manning, a three-story relic from the Des Moines River's steamboat days, is Keosauqua's most notable landmark.  Its unique Steamboat Gothic architecture mimics riverboats of the mid-1800s. The hotel was placed on the National Register of Historic Places in April 1973.

Also located in Keosauqua are many other notable historic sites. The 1847 Pearson House was a stop on the underground railroad.  The Van Buren County Courthouse, built in 1843 in the Greek Revival style, is the oldest in continuous use in the state, and second-oldest in the United States. It is also on the National Register of Historic Places.  The courthouse was the scene for the murder trial of William McCauley. A guilty verdict led to his subsequent demise at, appropriately, Hangman's Hollow.  It was the first legal hanging in Iowa history.

When Brigham Young and his followers were exiled from their base at Nauvoo, Illinois in 1846, their caravan crossed the Des Moines River at Ely's Ford, just upriver from Keosauqua on what is now known as the Mormon Trail.

Van Buren County native Voltaire Twombly received the Congressional Medal of Honor for actions taken at Ft. Donelson during the American Civil War.  His post-war pursuits included a stint as mayor of Keosauqua and, as a businessman there, he built a stone building on the main street that remains to this day.

The 1839 Honey War, so named because three trees with beehives were cut down in the process, was fought south of Keosauqua in what is now Lacey-Keosauqua State Park. The event was a border disagreement between Iowa and Missouri. Before it was over, militias from both sides faced each other, though the dispute was ultimately resolved without a shot being fired.

Lacey-Keosauqua is one of the largest state parks in Iowa and was built by the Civil Conservation Corps during the Great Depression.  The lake bathhouse and lodge stone work, from stone quarried within the park, remain outstanding testament to their work.

Keosauqua hosts its annual Fall Festival the second full weekend in October.

Geography
Keosauqua is located at  (40.732089, -91.963027).

Keosauqua is in the Southern Iowa Drift Plain, formed by Pre-Illinoian glaciers approximately 300,000 years ago. The topography of the area is heavily forested rolling hills, interspersed with farmland, and has many tributaries flowing into the Des Moines River. The Des Moines was large enough to handle steamboat traffic in the 1800s and was the reason that Keosauqua was founded.

Demographics

2010 census
As of the census of 2010, there were 1,006 people, 459 households, and 251 families residing in the city. The racial makeup of the city was 97.6% White, 0.4% African American, 0.9% Asian, 0.1% from other races, and 1.0% from two or more races. Hispanic or Latino of any race were 1.1% of the population.

There were 459 households, of which 20.7% had children under the age of 18 living with them, 43.1% were married couples living together, 7.4% had a female householder with no husband present, 4.1% had a male householder with no wife present, and 45.3% were non-families. 41.6% of all households were made up of individuals, and 23.3% had someone living alone who was 65 years of age or older. The average household size was 2.06 and the average family size was 2.79.

The median age in the city was 50.9 years. 17.5% of residents were under the age of 18; 7.2% were between the ages of 18 and 24; 18.5% were from 25 to 44; 28.3% were from 45 to 64; and 28.8% were 65 years of age or older. The gender makeup of the city was 46.9% male and 53.1% female.

2000 census
As of the census of 2000, there were 1,066 people, 467 households, and 270 families residing in the city. The racial makeup of the city was 98.59% White, 0.19% African American, 0.28% Asian, and 0.94% from two or more races. Hispanic or Latino of any race were 0.09% of the population.

There were 467 households, out of which 24.6% had children under the age of 18 living with them, 44.5% were married couples living together, 10.5% had a female householder with no husband present, and 42.0% were non-families. 38.5% of all households were made up of individuals, and 24.8% had someone living alone who was 65 years of age or older. The average household size was 2.10 and the average family size was 2.77.

Age spread: 19.9% under the age of 18, 6.1% from 18 to 24, 19.5% from 25 to 44, 23.1% from 45 to 64, and 31.4% who were 65 years of age or older. The median age was 49 years. For every 100 females, there were 77.4 males. For every 100 females age 18 and over, there were 73.9 males.

The median income for a household in the city was $27,833, and the median income for a family was $37,063. Males had a median income of $25,489 versus $19,904 for females. The per capita income for the city was $16,097. About 7.7% of families and 12.1% of the population were below the poverty line, including 14.5% of those under age 18 and 12.7% of those age 65 or over.

Education
The community is served by the Van Buren County Community School District. It was previously in the Van Buren Community School District, until it merged into Van Buren County CSD on July 1, 2019.

Keosauqua is home to the Van Buren Warriors at Van Buren High School; Harmony High School consolidated into it at the end of the 2015–2016 school year as part of a grade-sharing arrangement. In 2018 the Van Buren district voted to merge with the Harmony Community School District.

Government
Keosauqua is the location of Iowa's oldest courthouse in continuous use; it was built in 1840. The adjacent Hangman's Hollow is the site of the first legal hanging in the state of Iowa.

Notable people  

Josiah H. Bonney (1817–1887), Iowa Secretary of State and territorial legislator.
Smith W. Brookhart (1869–1944) US Senator from Iowa
Henry Clay Caldwell (1832–1915) United States federal judge and Union Army officer.
Caroline Matilda Dodson (1845–1898), physician
Sallie Fox (1845–1913), California pioneer who spent her childhood in Keosauqua  
James B. Howell (1816–1880), newspaper editor and U.S. Senator, resided in Keosauqua
Leonard John Rose (1827-1899), California pioneer and leader of the Rose–Baley Party who lived in Keosauqua from 1848 to 1858 
Theodosia Burr Shepherd (1845–1906), botanist
Phil Stong (1899–1957), an American author, journalist and Hollywood scenarist. He is best known for writing the novel State Fair, upon which three films were based; one starring Will Rogers (1933) and two that were Rodgers and Hammerstein musicals (1945 and 1962).
Voltaire P. Twombly, (1842–1918), Iowan politician, businessman and Medal of Honor recipient for the American Civil War, is buried in Keosauqua. Twombly briefly served as mayor of Keosauqua, where he had worked as a merchant.
Edward K. Valentine (1843–1916) US Representative from Nebraska
George G. Wright (1820–1896) US Senator from Iowa

Gallery

See also

Bentonsport is a 35-acre historical district that was listed on the National Register of Historic Places in 1972.
Lake Sugema is a constructed artificial  lake.
The Great Flood of 1851
USS Keosauqua was a proposed and partially built United States Navy ship during the Civil War.
Des Moines Rapids limited Steamboat traffic through the early 19th century.
Sullivan Line is the history of the border between Missouri and Iowa.
Shimek State Forest

Footnotes

External links
 
City-Data Comprehensive Statistical Data and more about Keosauqua
Keosauqua Chamber of Commerce

 
Cities in Iowa
Cities in Van Buren County, Iowa
Populated places on the Underground Railroad
County seats in Iowa
Populated places established in 1839
1839 establishments in Iowa Territory